The University of Massachusetts Amherst College of Engineering is one of the schools and colleges at the University of Massachusetts Amherst. It was established on September 1, 1947 as the School of Engineering and now considered as the best public engineering school in New England, enrolling 2250 undergraduate students and 610 graduate students including 300 M.S. students and 310 Ph.D. students for the 2018–2019 school year. The College of Engineering at UMass Amherst has eight buildings, including the Elab II, research facilities, computer labs, and graduate offices. It has more than 16,000 living alumni around the world.

Departments
The College of Engineering at University of Massachusetts Amherst contains five departments:

 Biomedical Engineering
Chemical Engineering
Civil and Environmental Engineering
Electrical and Computer Engineering
Mechanical and Industrial Engineering

Academics
The College of Engineering at the University of Massachusetts Amherst offers seven Bachelor of Science (B.S.) degrees. These programs are accredited by the Engineering Accreditation Commission of ABET:

Undergraduate programs

Bachelor of Science (B.S.) degrees
Biomedical Engineering
Chemical Engineering
Civil Engineering
Computer Engineering
Electrical Engineering
Industrial Engineering
Mechanical Engineering

Graduate programs

Master of Science (M.S.) degrees
Chemical Engineering
Civil Engineering
Environmental Engineering
Electrical and Computer Engineering
Industrial Engineering
Mechanical Engineering
Agricultural Engineering

Doctoral programs

Doctor of Philosophy (PhD) degrees
Chemical Engineering
Civil Engineering
Electrical and Computer Engineering
Industrial Engineering
Mechanical Engineering

Research Centers
The College of Engineering at the University of Massachusetts Amherst host number of research centers including;
Center for Biological Physics
 Center for e-Design
 Center for Energy Efficiency and Renewable Energy 
 Center for Hierarchical Manufacturing  
 Cybersecurity Institute
 Center for Collaborative Adaptive Sensing of the Atmosphere
 Institute for Applied Life Sciences 
 Center for Bioactive Delivery
 Center for Personalized Health Monitoring
 Models to Medicine Center
 MassNanoTech Institute
 Materials Research Science and Engineering Center 
 Northeast Climate Adaption Science Center 
 The Institute for Massachusetts Biofuels Research (TIMBR)
 UMass Transportation Center 
 Water Resources Research Center 
 Wind Energy Center
 WINSSS: National Center for Innovative Small Drinking Water Systems

See also 
 List of research centers at the University of Massachusetts Amherst

References

External links 
 

Engineering schools and colleges in the United States
Engineering universities and colleges in Massachusetts
University of Massachusetts Amherst schools
University subdivisions in Massachusetts